Kathryn Doi Todd (born January 14, 1942) is a retired associate justice of the California Second District Court of Appeal, Division Two, having been appointed to the post by Governor Gray Davis in 2000.

Biography 
Kathryn Asako Doi was born in Los Angeles, California, and is of Japanese descent. She was interned at the Heart Mountain Relocation Center as an infant after President Franklin D. Roosevelt signed Executive Order 9066. After receiving her diploma from Los Angeles High School in 1959, she earned an AB in history from Stanford University in 1963 and a JD from Loyola Law School in 1970, where was Order of the Coif and editor of the Loyola Law Review.  From 1971 to 1978, Todd was an attorney in Little Tokyo. She was a founder member of the Japanese American Bar Association (JABA).

In 1978, Governor Jerry Brown appointed her to the Los Angeles County Municipal Court, making her the first female Asian American judge in the United States. In 1981, Brown elevated Todd to the Los Angeles County Superior Court, a position she would hold until when Brown's former chief of staff, Governor Gray Davis, appointed her to the California Second District Court of Appeal, Division Two as of August 18, 2000. Doi retired from the bench in January 2013.

In 2014 she received the Margaret Brent Award from the American Bar Association.

Personal life
On June 16, 1974, Doi married sculptor Michael C. Todd, with whom she has one daughter, Mia, who is a singer and songwriter. The couple divorced while she was on the Superior Court.

See also
List of Asian American jurists

References

External links
Official biography of Kathryn Doi Todd. California Court of Appeal, Second District.
Kathryn Doi Todd profile on Judgepedia

1942 births
Living people
Lawyers from Los Angeles
Los Angeles High School alumni
Stanford University alumni
Loyola Law School alumni
American jurists of Japanese descent
Judges of the California Courts of Appeal
Superior court judges in the United States
20th-century American judges
21st-century American judges
Japanese-American internees
20th-century American women judges
21st-century American women judges